Great Plains College is a regional college in  that provides post-secondary education in the western part of the province. It currently offers post-secondary certificate, diploma and degree programs — as well as university programming, skills and safety training, adult basic education and English language training - through campuses in Swift Current, Kindersley and Warman as well as program centres in Biggar, Maple Creek and Rosetown. Great Plains College was formed via a 2008 merger between Cypress Hills Regional College and Prairie West Regional College.

Programs
The college provides certificate, diploma and degree programs in a variety of fields and trades. Post-secondary offerings in 2015-16 include Administrative Assistant; Business; Bachelor of Social Work; Boom Truck, Crane & Hoist Operator; Certificate in Health, Safety and Environmental Processes; Continuing Care Assistant; Diploma in Safety, Health and Environmental Management; Early Childhood Education;  Electrician; Heavy Equipment Operator; Master of Business Administration in Community Economic Development; Power Engineering (Fourth Class and Third Class); Practical Nursing; Saskatchewan Collaborative Bachelor of Science in Nursing; Welding; and Youth Care Worker.

A limited number of university courses are also offered at the college in partnership with the University of Saskatchewan and University of Regina.

Campuses
Great Plains College has campuses in Swift Current, Warman, and Kindersley, along with program centres in Maple Creek, Biggar and Rosetown. Swift Current Campus is home to the only indoor fall protection and rig rescue tower in the province, SunDogs Athletics - the only competitive athletics program in Saskatchewan's regional college system, and a recently completed $13.5 million renovation and expansion.

History
Cypress Hills College and Prairie West College announced March 4, 2008, their intention to merge the two institutions into a new college to be called Great Plains College. The goal of the merger was to enhance and expand the programs and services for students who attend campuses in communities across western Saskatchewan from Warman to Maple Creek. The college also has created programs to support First Nations students and recently renewed a strategic alliance with the Office of the Treaty Commissioner to promote an inclusive educational environment.

Athletics
The Swift Current campus has an athletic program known as the Great Plains SunDogs that compete in the Prairie Athletic Conference. They currently play men's and women's volleyball, and formerly men's and women's basketball.

Provincial Championships
Men's Volleyball (2009, 2011, 2013)
Women's Volleyball (2018, 2019)

See also
Higher education in Saskatchewan
List of agricultural universities and colleges
List of colleges in Canada#Saskatchewan

References

External links
Great Plains College

Colleges in Saskatchewan
Buildings and structures in Swift Current
Educational institutions established in 1973
Vocational education in Canada
1973 establishments in Saskatchewan